Raavi (రావి) (different from Ravi, which means Sun.) is one of the surnames (last names) in  Brahmin and Kamma caste.  Raavi is the Telugu word for Peepal Tree.

People of this surname (lineage) are predominantly found in Coastal region of Andhra Pradesh in districts of Krishna, Guntur and Prakasam. 

Raavivaripalem is the birthplace for this lineage. This village is near Challapalli (Krishna district).

See also
 Raavi Kondala Rao, Famous Telugu film personality
 Raavi Narayana Reddy, Telangana Freedom Fighter
 Ravi (name)

Telugu-language surnames